In mathematics, the binomial series is a generalization of the polynomial that comes from a binomial formula expression like  for a nonnegative integer . Explicitly,

Special cases 

If  is a nonnegative integer , then the th term and all later terms in the series are 0, since each contains a factor ; thus in this case the series is finite and gives the algebraic binomial formula.

Explicitly,

which is written in terms of the multiset coefficient

Convergence

Conditions for convergence 

Whether converges depends on the values of the complex numbers  and . More precisely:

If , the series converges absolutely for any complex number . 
If , the series diverges, unless  is a non-negative integer (in which case the series is a finite sum).

In particular, if  is not a non-negative integer, the situation at the boundary of the disk of convergence,  is summarized as follows:

 If , the series converges absolutely.
 If , the series converges conditionally if  and diverges if .
 If , the series diverges.

Identities to be used in the proof 

The following hold for any complex number :

This is essentially equivalent to Euler's definition of the Gamma function:

and implies immediately the coarser bounds

Formula for the generalized binomial coefficient can be rewritten as

Proof 

To prove (i) and (v), apply the ratio test and use formula above to show that whenever  is not a nonnegative integer, the radius of convergence is exactly 1.  Part (ii) follows from formula, by comparison with the -series

To prove (iii), first use formula to obtain

and then use (ii) and formula again to prove convergence of the right-hand side when  is assumed. Alternatively, we may observe that for all , . Thus, by formula, for all . This completes the proof of (iii).

Assertion (iv) now follows from the asymptotic behavior of the sequence . (Precisely, 
certainly converges to  if  and diverges to  if . If , then  converges if and only if the sequence  converges , which is certainly true if  but false if : in the latter case the sequence is dense , due to the fact that  diverges and  converges to zero).

Summation of the binomial series 

The usual argument to compute the sum of the binomial series goes as follows. Differentiating term-wise the binomial series within the disk of convergence  and using formula, one has that the sum of the series is an analytic function solving the ordinary differential equation  with initial data .

History 

The first results concerning binomial series for other than positive-integer exponents were given by Sir Isaac Newton in the study of areas enclosed under certain curves. John Wallis built upon this work by considering expressions of the form  where  is a fraction. He explicitly writes the following instances

The binomial series is therefore sometimes referred to as Newton's binomial theorem. Newton gives no proof and is not explicit about the nature of the series. Later, on 1826 Niels Henrik Abel discussed the subject in a paper published on Crelle's Journal, treating notably questions of convergence.

See also

Binomial approximation
Binomial theorem
Table of Newtonian series

Footnotes

Notes

Citations

References

External links 

Complex analysis
Factorial and binomial topics
Mathematical series
Real analysis